Turki may refer to:

Languages
 Azerbaijani language, known as Türki for its speakers in Iran
 Chagatai language, also known as Turki
 Ili Turki language
 Old Anatolian Turkish, also known as Türki
 Old Tatar, also known as Volga Turki
 Ottoman Turkish, also known as Türkî
 Uyghur language, formerly known as Eastern Turki
 Uzbek language, formerly known as Western Turki
 Qashqai language, known as Turki to its speakers

Others
Turki (name), a first or a last name
Turki (urban-type settlement), a work settlement in Saratov Oblast, Russia

See also

 
 Turky (disambiguation)
 Turke (disambiguation)
 Turkey (disambiguation)
 Turkiye (disambiguation)
 Turkish (disambiguation)
 Turkic (disambiguation)